The Jingtai Emperor (21 September 1428 –  14 March 1457), born Zhu Qiyu, was the seventh Emperor of the Ming dynasty, and reigned from 1449 to 1457. The second son of the Xuande Emperor, he was selected in 1449 to succeed his elder brother Emperor Yingzong (then reigning as the Zhengtong Emperor), when the latter was captured by Mongols following the Tumu Crisis. He ruled for eight years before being removed from the throne by his elder brother Yingzong (who then reigned as the "Tianshun Emperor"). The Jingtai Emperor's era name, "Jingtai", means "exalted view". He was one of two Ming emperors who was not buried in either the Ming tombs in Beijing or the Xiaoling Mausoleum in Nanjing.

Early life 
The future Jingtai Emperor was born on 21 September 1428 with the name Zhu Qiyu to the Xuande Emperor and Consort Xian. On 3 August 1449, he was appointed regent by his older half-brother, the Zhengtong Emperor.

Zhu Qiyu would ascend the throne by the Ming court in 1449 after his brother was defeated and taken prisoner by the Oirat Mongols of Esen Khan. He immediately set about the defence of Beijing and was ultimately successful.

Reign
During his reign, aided by the able minister Yu Qian, Jingtai paid particular attention to matters affecting his country. He repaired the Grand Canal as well as the system of dykes along the Yellow River. As a result of his administration, the economy prospered and the dynasty was further strengthened.

In 1452, he demoted his first wife  Empress Wang (1427–1507) since she had only had two daughters, and not a son. He instead promoted his Consort Hang to become empress, but her five-year-old son, Zhu Jianji, died in 1453 under suspicious circumstances, and she bore no other children.

The Zhengtong Emperor was released in 1450 after the Mongols learned that the Ming government had installed Zhu Qiyu as the new emperor. After that, Jingtai continued to rule as emperor while his brother was granted the title of Taishang Huang (or Emperor Emeritus; 太上皇) and lived in obscurity.

Deposition and death 
Jingtai reigned for eight years. Empress Hang died in 1456, and Jingtai himself became ill. With his death imminent in 1457, he still refused to name an heir, particularly because his own son had died mysteriously in 1453—perhaps poisoned. Jingtai's predecessor, his brother the sidelined Zhengtong Emperor, saw an opportunity to regain the throne and through a military coup overthrew the ailing Jingtai. Zhengtong then adopted a new era name, "Tianshun", and was henceforth known as the Tianshun Emperor. Jingtai was demoted by his brother to his previous title, Prince of Cheng, and placed under house arrest in Xiyuan (西苑). He died a month later, with some sources hinting that he was murdered by eunuchs on the order of the Tianshun Emperor.

After the Jingtai Emperor's death, the Tianshun Emperor denied his brother's rightful honor to be buried at the Ming tombs (together with his predecessors) located north of Beijing. He was instead buried well away from that locale in the hills west of Beijing and was buried as a prince rather than an emperor. His posthumous name was also shortened to five characters, instead of the normal seventeen, to reflect his demoted status. His brother also did not respect the emperor's wish to set up his own son as heir apparent.

Family
Consorts and Issue:
 Empress Xiaoyuanjing, of the Wang clan (1427–1507)
 Princess Gu'an (1449–1491), first daughter
 Married Wang Xian in 1469, and had issue (one son)
 Second daughter
 Empress Suxiao, of the Hang clan (d. 1456)
 Zhu Jianji, Crown Prince Huaixian (28 March 1445 – 21 March 1453), first son
 Imperial Noble Consort, of the Tang clan (1438–1457)
 Li Xi'er
 Consort, of the Sun clan

Ancestry

See also
 Chinese emperors family tree (late)

Notes

|-

1428 births
1457 deaths
Ming dynasty emperors
15th-century Chinese monarchs